Peggy Feury (born Margaret Feury; June 30, 1924 – November 20, 1985) was an American actress on Broadway, in films, and on television. She became a highly regarded acting teacher in New York and then in Los Angeles.  Throughout her career, she taught many notable students.

Education 
Feury was born in Jersey City, New Jersey.  Her father was Richard Feury; her mother, born in Ireland, was also Margaret Feury; and her younger sister was Elinor Feury. She graduated from Barnard College, then attended the Yale School of Drama, later studying with Lee Strasberg at the Actors Studio, and with Sanford Meisner at the Neighborhood Playhouse.

While at Yale, Feury met and then married her first husband, playwright Louis S. Peterson. Less than a decade later, following their divorce and Feury's remarriage, Peterson's semi-autobiographical play Entertain a Ghost was produced, chronicling a deteriorating marriage between a fictional playwright and actress with obvious parallels to Peterson and Feury. The play received from the Village Voice a positive and detailed review that expressed the feeling that the production should have run longer. It described it as "a daring and deeply exploratory new play, the best damned failure I've seen in years".

Actress 
As Margaret Feury she appeared on Broadway in Me and Molly; Sunday Breakfast (staged by noted acting teacher Stella Adler); Enter Laughing; Peer Gynt, starring John Garfield, Mildred Dunnock, and Karl Malden, directed by Lee Strasberg; The Grass Harp, directed by Actors Studio co-founder Robert Lewis; The Lady of the Camellias, directed by Franco Zeffirelli, Chekov's Three Sisters, directed by Strasberg (with Feury eventually replacing Geraldine Page as Olga), and The Turn of the Screw. Off-Broadway she starred in Frank Wedekind's Earth Spirit at the Provincetown Playhouse.

Between 1956 and 1969, the Actors Studio undertook a project to record and archive work that was being done there, including performances of scenes from dramatic literature. These recordings have been archived as part of the University of Wisconsin Digital Collections. Feury participated in this project from its inception until her relocation to Los Angeles in December 1968.

Feury appeared in a number of television dramas beginning in the Golden Age of Television, including, in 1961, a significant role she played in “Murder is a Face I Know”, an episode from The Naked City, which can be found on the internet.

In November 1961, an early draft of the first scene of Edward Albee’s play, Who's Afraid of Virginia Woolf? was presented on the public television program Playwright at Work. The characters George and Martha – which would later be originated on stage by Arthur Hill and Uta Hagen, and on screen by Richard Burton and Elizabeth Taylor – were portrayed by Shepperd Strudwick and Feury.

On October 2, 1977, Feury appeared in Iowa, the second season premiere of Visions, PBS's Peabody Award-winning dramatic anthology series; it was directed by Lloyd Richards, and was playwright Murray Mednick's television debut. The critical reaction was disappointment, but the actors fared better, Feury in particular. As the unwilling nursing home resident whose disjointed recollections provide her granddaughter an invaluable connection to her Iowa roots, Feury's portrayal was judged "[b]y far the best acting performance" by The Hartford Courant. Her performance, as the character veers "from family feeling to suspicion to self-absorbed recollection" – was noted by The Boston Globe, with The Los Angeles Times citing her "almost effortless grace" and "marvelous ferocity." Critic James Wolcott writes: 
One scene teems with unruly life: Eileen visits her grandmother (Peggy Feury) in the nursing home, and the grandma's semi-senile outbursts have a crazy, cawing theatricality. "This is a cattle yard," says Feury's crone as the camera stares down the discarded people. "Bellowing, constant bellowing." Another patient – babbling "Operator, operator, operator" – is wheeled across the screen and grandma, like an Alice-in-Wonderland queen, issues a command: "Choke her!" This disreputably funny scene is capped when a nurse happens by and – perfect joke – turns out to be a Lily Tomlin lookalike.

In 1982, Feury appeared as "Colonel Buckholtz," a perfectionist colonel who inspects Margaret Houlihan and the nurses in "Hey, Look Me Over," the opening episode of M*A*S*H Season 11.

Feury's film credits include Matt Cimber's The Witch Who Came from the Sea (1976), Richard C. Sarafian's The Next Man (1976) starring Sean Connery, Elia Kazan's film of The Last Tycoon (1976), starring Robert De Niro, Carl Reiner's All of Me (1984), starring Steve Martin and Lily Tomlin, Ken Russell's Crimes of Passion (1984), and Feury's final screen performance, in 1918 (1985), written by Horton Foote.  A brief appearance in Donald Shebib's Heartaches (1981) was singled out by New York Times critic Vincent Canby: "That very fine actress Peggy Feury appears in a tiny but important scene as the doctor who advises Bonnie about a possible abortion."

By far Feury's most substantial film role (in terms of both sheer size and importance to a film's narrative) came in a little seen low-budget psychological horror film – John Ballard's Friday the 13th: The Orphan (1979), based on the short story Sredni Vashtar by Saki. In Nightmare USA (his 2007 study of lesser-known American exploitation filmmakers), Stephen Thrower writes:
Then there's Peggy Feury, a skilled and thoughtful actress who demonstrates here how she came to be one of the leading lights in her profession. (She taught acting at the Actors Studio, alongside Lee Strasberg.) The role of Aunt Martha is already well-written, but Feury brings her own amazingly subtle shadings to the part.

Teacher 
Feury was a charter member of the Actors Studio and frequently led sessions there when Lee Strasberg was unavailable. She also taught her own classes in the same building where Strasberg taught, behind Carnegie Hall.

In December 1968, at Strasberg's suggestion, Feury moved to Los Angeles with her husband William Traylor and their two daughters. After a brief stint teaching at Jack Garfein's Actors and Directors Lab, Feury helped establish the west coast branch of the Lee Strasberg Theatre Institute, where she would double as instructor and artistic director  until 1973, when she and Traylor started their own acting school, the Loft Studio, on LaBrea Avenue.

Sean Penn was 18 when he arrived at the Loft; he remained for two years, attending class twenty-five hours a week. Feury's "very gentle," "very personal" approach quickly won over the fiercely independent young actor, as did her emphasis on discovering "how [to] bring yourself to the material rather than the material to you." To Anjelica Huston, who began her studies in 1981 at age 30, Feury was "a revelation," with "a vast knowledge of playwrights" and "an extraordinary gift for making one feel understood." Huston describes her teacher as "beautiful," " quite small and delicate," with a "half way to heaven look." On the other hand, notes Huston, Feury was "extremely intelligent and mordant, Irish, with certain very visceral preferences", and yet had "a way of commenting on a scene that was never destructive. [Even when] you knew she thought it was pretty terrible, she had a way of translating it positively to actors – her process was very reinforcing, I think."

Feury was occasionally called upon to coach an individual actor in a role, as she did Michelle Pfeiffer in Brian De Palma's Scarface (1983) and Lily Tomlin in her one-woman stage show The Search for Signs of Intelligent Life in the Universe. The evolution of Tomlin's show formed the basis of a 1986 documentary in which Feury appeared posthumously; Tomlin dedicated the film to her memory.

From the mid 1970s  until her death, Feury and her students frequently showcased the work of playwright Horton Foote, presenting four of his plays in their entirety plus a number of individual scenes from Foote's The Orphans' Home Cycle. In 1984, in her final film role, Feury was cast in the film version of Foote’s 1918, the seventh of The Orphans' Home Cycle's nine plays.

Notable students

 Antero Alli, director
 Richard Dean Anderson 
 Ed Begley Jr. 
 Sam Behrens
 Hart Bochner
 Ellen Burstyn
 Nicolas Cage
 Dean Cameron 
 James Cromwell
 Johnny Depp
 Laura Dern
 Hallie Foote
 Arthur French,
Melissa Gilbert
 Clarence Gilyard
 Crispin Glover 
 Jeff Goldblum
 Lou Gossett Jr.
 John Gulager, filmmaker
 Marilyn Hassett 
 Grainger Hines 
 Anjelica Huston
 Joanna Kerns
 Callie Khouri, Oscar-winning screenwriter
 Bruno Kirby 
 Vonetta McGee
 Michelle Meyrink 
 Taylor Miller 
 Bobby Moresco, Oscar-winning screenwriter
 Annette O'Toole
 Sachi Parker 
 Christopher Penn 
 Sean Penn
 Michelle Pfeiffer
 Michelle Phillips 
 Meg Ryan 
 Albie Selznick
 Robert R. Shafer 
 Charlie Sheen
 Eric Stoltz 
 Meg Tilly
 Lily Tomlin 
 Irene Tsu 
 Kate Vernon
 Rosalie Williams 
 Daphne Zuniga,
 Milcha Sanchez-Scott, playwright
 Brian Sheehan 
 Peter Nelson

Illness and death 
Feury struggled with narcolepsy. When she would come out of one of its spells she could be lucid as though she had been alert during the episode.  She died Wednesday, November 20, 1985 in a car accident, a head-on collision, in West Los Angeles.

Stage credits (partial listing)
These are acting credits except where otherwise indicated.

Notes

References

Further reading
"Experimental Studio Theatre Announces Weekend Sessions in Acting". The Montreal Gazette. September 23, 1958.
"New Teacher for Actors Engaged". The Montreal Gazette. September 24, 1958.
"Strasberg to Evaluate Drama Problems". The Upland News. June 1, 1972.
"'Visions' Series Begins New Season". The Lakeland Ledger. October 2, 1977.
Associated Press. "Teacher Dies". The Albany Herald. November 24, 1985.
Maxwell, Bea. "Video Will Feature D.C. Orchestra". The Los Angeles Times. April 26, 1990.
Lally, Michael (1999). "Lost Angels" (for Peggy Feury). It's Not Nostalgia: Poetry & Prose. Santa Rosa, CA: Black Sparrow Press. pp. 149–154. . 

Pascoe, Judd. "Letter to my acting teacher". JustAddFather.com. August 28, 2011.
Oakley, James. "Susan Traylor's LA Story". Interview Magazine. July 11, 2012.

External links
Peggy Feury at the University of Wisconsin's Actors Studio audio collection, 1956–1969

Peggy Feury at SMU Central University Libraries' collection: Horton Foote Photographs and Manuscripts

1924 births
1985 deaths
People from New Jersey
Drama teachers
American directors
American stage actresses
American film actresses
American television actresses
20th-century American actresses
Actors Studio alumni
Barnard College alumni
Yale School of Drama alumni
American acting theorists